Hebert William Carvalho da Conceição Sousa (born 28 February 1998) is a Brazilian professional boxer. As an amateur, Conceição won a gold medal at the 2020 Olympic Games as well as winning a bronze medal at the 2019 World Championships. Conceição also won a silver medal at the 2019 Pan American Games and a bronze medal at the 2018 South American Games.

Amateur career

Olympics result
Tokyo 2020
Round of 16: Defeated Tuohetaerbieke Tanglatihan (China) 3–2
Quarter-finals: Defeated Abilkhan Amankul (Kazakhstan) 3–2
Semi-finals: Defeated Gleb Bakshi (ROC) 4–1
Final: Defeated Oleksandr Khyzhniak (Ukraine) KO

World Championships result
Yekaterinburg 2019
Round of 32: Defeated Andrej Mersljakov (Germany) 3–2
Round of 16: Defeated Fanat Kakhramonov (Uzbekistan) 3–2
Quarter-finals: Defeated Salvatore Cavallaro (Italy) 4–1
Semi-final: Defeated by Gleb Bakshi (Russia) 4–1

Pan American Games result
Lima 2019
Quarter-finals: Defeated Francisco Verón (Argentina) 3–2
Semi-finals: Defeated Troy Isley (United States) 4–1
Final: Defeated by Arlen López (Cuba) 5–0

Professional boxing record

References

External links

1998 births
Living people
Brazilian male boxers
AIBA World Boxing Championships medalists
Middleweight boxers
Boxers at the 2020 Summer Olympics
Medalists at the 2020 Summer Olympics
Olympic gold medalists for Brazil
Olympic medalists in boxing
Olympic boxers of Brazil
Sportspeople from Salvador, Bahia
Pan American Games silver medalists for Brazil
Pan American Games medalists in boxing
Boxers at the 2019 Pan American Games
Medalists at the 2019 Pan American Games
South American Games bronze medalists for Brazil
South American Games medalists in boxing
Competitors at the 2018 South American Games
20th-century Brazilian people
21st-century Brazilian people